Heike is a given name of Germanic origin, most commonly but not exclusively female. The male form is Heiko. Notable persons with this name include:

Feminine

 Heike Blaßneck (born 1971), German hurdler
 Heike Balck (born 1970), German high jumper
 Heike Dähne (born 1961), German  swimmer
 Heike Drechsler (born 1964), German track and field athlete
 Heike Faber (born 1965), German television actress
 Heike Fassbender, German mathematician
 Heike Fischer (born 1982), German diver
 Heike Friedrich (born 1970), German freestyle swimmer
 Heike Henkel (born 1964), German former athlete
 Heike Hennig (born 1966), German choreographer and director
 Heike Kemmer (born 1962), German equestrian gold medalist
 Heike Koerner (born 1973), Mexican backstroke swimmer
 Heike Langguth (born 1979), German vice-champion in Muay Thai
 Heike Lätzsch (born 1973), German field hockey striker
 Heike Lehmann (born 1962), German volleyball
 Heike Makatsch (born 1971), German actress
 Heike Meißner (born 1970), German athlete
 Heike Popel, East German luger
 Heike Rabenow is an East German sprint canoer
 Heike Riel (born 1971), German nanotechnologies
 Heike Schulte-Mattler (born 1958), German athlete
 Heike Schwaller (born 1968), German-Swiss curler
 Heike Tischler (born 1964), German heptathlete
 Heike Warnicke (born 1966),  German speed skater
 Heike Wezel (born 1968), German cross country skier
 Heike Wilms-Kegel (born 1952), physician
 Heike Lavrijsen (born 2007), very cool person

Masculine
 Heike Kamerlingh Onnes (1853–1926), Dutch physicist

Surname
 Georg Heike (born 1933), German phonetician and linguist.
 Jürgen W. Heike (1949-2022), German politician
 Michiyo Heike (born 1979), Japanese singer-songwriter

See also
 Heike (disambiguation)

German unisex given names